David Beaumont (born 17 September 1944) is an English cricketer. He played eleven first-class matches for Cambridge University Cricket Club between 1977 and 1978.

See also
 List of Cambridge University Cricket Club players

References

External links
 

1944 births
Living people
English cricketers
Cambridge University cricketers
People from West Bridgford
Cricketers from Nottinghamshire